A dovecote or dovecot , doocot (Scots) or columbarium is a structure intended to house pigeons or doves. Dovecotes may be free-standing structures in a variety of shapes, or built into the end of a house or barn. They generally contain pigeonholes for the birds to nest. Pigeons and doves were an important food source historically in the Middle East and Europe and were kept for their eggs and dung.

History and geography

The oldest dovecotes are thought to have been the fortress-like dovecotes of Upper Egypt, and the domed dovecotes of Iran. In these regions, the droppings were used by farmers for fertilizing. Pigeon droppings were also used for leather tanning and making gunpowder. 

In some cultures, particularly Medieval Europe, the possession of a dovecote was a symbol of status and power and was consequently regulated by law. Only nobles had this special privilege, known as droit de colombier.

Many ancient manors in France and the United Kingdom have a dovecote still standing (or in ruins) in a section of the manorial enclosure, or in nearby fields. Examples include Château de Kerjean in Brittany, France, Houchin, France, Bodysgallen Hall in Wales, and Muchalls Castle and Newark Castle in Scotland.

Columbaria in ancient Rome

The presence of dovecotes is not documented in France before the Roman invasion of Gaul by Caesar. The pigeon farm was then a passion in Rome: The Roman-style, generally round, columbarium had its interior covered with a white coating of marble powder. Varro, Columella, and Pliny, all wrote about pigeon farming and dovecote construction.

In the city of Rome in the time of the Republic and the Empire the internal design of the banks of pigeonholes was adapted for the purpose of disposing of cremated ashes after death: These columbaria were generally constructed underground.

France
The French word for dovecote is pigeonnier or colombier. In some French provinces, especially Normandy, the dovecotes were built of wood in a very stylized way. Stone was the other popular building material for these old dovecotes. These stone structures were usually built in circular, square and occasionally octagonal form. Some of the medieval French abbeys had very large stone dovecotes on their grounds.

In Brittany, the dovecote was sometimes built directly into the upper walls of the farmhouse or manor-house. In rare cases, it was built into the upper gallery of the lookout tower (for example at the Toul-an-Gollet manor in Plesidy, Brittany). Dovecotes of this type are called tour-fuie in French.

Even some of the larger château-forts, such as the Château de Suscinio in Morbihan, still have a complete dovecote standing on the grounds, outside the moat and walls of the castle.

Colombiers and pigeonniers in France

In France, it was called a colombier, fuie or pigeonnier. With its extensive cultivation of grain, the favourite food of pigeons, France had 42,000 pigeonniers by the 17th Century, especially in Normandy and the Midi.

The dovecote interior, the space granted to the pigeons, is divided into a number of boulins (pigeon holes). Each boulin is the lodging of a pair of pigeons. These boulins can be in rock, brick or cob (adobe) and installed at the time of the construction of the dovecote or be in pottery (jars lying sideways, flat tiles, etc.), in braided wicker in the form of a basket or of a nest. It is the number of boulins that indicates the capacity of the dovecote. The ones at the chateau d'Aulnay in Aulnay-sous-Bois and the one at Château de Panloy in Port-d'Envaux are among the largest in France.

In the Middle Ages, particularly in France, the possession of a colombier à pied (dovecote on the ground accessible by foot), constructed separately from the corps de logis of the manor-house (having boulins from the top down), was a privilege of the seigneurial lord. He was granted permission by his overlord to build a dovecote or two on his estate lands. For the other constructions, the dovecote rights (droit de colombier) varied according to the provinces. They had to be in proportion to the importance of the property, placed in a floor above a henhouse, a kennel, a bread oven, even a wine cellar.

Middle East 
Dotted with wooden pegs and hundreds of holes, the towers provided shelter and breeding areas for the birds to nest and raise their young in a mostly harsh desert environment. In Saudi Arabia, fourteen towers were spotted in 2020 and were the oldest seen in the Middle Eastern country. They have often been spotted in Iran, Egypt, and Qatar, where they have a lengthy history dating back to the 13th century. Dovecotes are also prevalent in ancient Iran and Anatolia. Pigeons were found in human settlements in Egypt and the Middle East since the dawn of agriculture, probably attracted to seeds people planted for their crops.

Isfahan's ancient dovecotes 
In the 17th century, a European traveler counted up to 3000 dovecotes in the Isfahan area of Persia (Hadizadeh, 2006, 51–4). Today, over 300 historic dovecotes have been identified in Isfahan Province and a total of 65 have been registered on the National Heritage List (Rafiei, 1974, 118–24). Dovecotes were constructed to produce large quantities of high-quality organic fertilizer for Isfahan's rich market gardens. The largest dovecotes could house 14,000 birds, and were decorated in distinctive red bands so as to be easily recognizable to the pigeons.

Cappadocia's ancient dovecotes 
The dove cotes in Cappadocia are mostly designed like rooms which are set up by carving the rocks. The oldest examples of these cotes in the region were built in the 18th century but they are few. Most of the cotes in the region were built in the 19th and early 20th century (øúçen, 2008). It is significantly evident that the cotes were constructed near water sources, on a place, above the valley and their entrance, called as mouth of the cotes were mostly built in the east or south direction of valleys. By this way of construction, it was proposed to protect the cotes from cold and get sunlight inside. The cotes were generally constructed by carving the rocks as a room.

Greece

Dovecotes in Greece are known as Περιστεριώνες, Peristeriones (plural). Such structures are very popular in the Cycladic islands and in particular Tinos, which has 1300 dovecotes. The systematic breeding of doves and pigeons as sources of meat and fertilizer was introduced by the Venetians in the 15th century. Dovecotes are built in slopes protected by the prevailing north wind and oriented so that their facade is towards an open space.

Ireland

Stone dovecotes were built in Ireland from the Norman period onward, to supply meat to monastic kitchens and to large country houses. A traditional dovecote was a multistorey building with inner walls lined with alcoves or ledges to mimic a cave. They survive in many parts of Ireland, with notable examples at Ballybeg Priory, Oughterard, Cahir, Woodstock Estate, Mosstown, Adare. Three Irish Cistercian houses held dovecotes: St. Mary's Abbey, Glencairn, Mellifont Abbey and Kilcooley Abbey.

Italy
Dovecotes were included in several of the villa designs of Andrea Palladio. As an integral part of the World Heritage Site "Vicenza and the Palladian Villas of the Veneto", dovecotes such as those at Villa Barbaro enjoy a high level of protection.

Netherlands and Belgium

Dovecotes in Belgium are mostly associated with pigeon racing. They have special features, such as trap doors that allow pigeons to fly in, but not out. The Flemish word for dovecote is "duivenkot". The Dutch word for dovecote is "duiventoren", or "duiventil" for a smaller dovecot.

Spain
Dovecotes in Spain are known as a Palomar or Palomares (plural). These structures are very popular in the Tierra de Campos region and also has a scale model of this type of building at a Theme Park located in the Mudéjar de Olmedo. Other good examples are located at Museums located in Castroverde de Campos, (Zamora Province),  Villafáfila, (Zamora Province), Santoyo, (Palencia Province) and the famous "Palomar de la Huerta Noble" in the municipality of Isla Cristina (Huelva Province) which was built in the 18th century to house 36,000 pigeons.

Transylvania
The Szekely people of Transylvania incorporate a dovecote into the design of their famous gates. These intricately carved wooden structures feature a large arch with a slatted door, which is meant to admit drivers of carriages and wagons (although today the visitors are probably driving cars and trucks), and a smaller arch with a similar door for pedestrians. Across the top of the gate is a dovecote with 6-12 or more pigeonholes and a roof of wooden shingles or tiles.

England and Wales
The Romans may have introduced dovecotes or columbaria to Britain since pigeon holes have been found in Roman ruins at Caerwent. However, it is believed that doves were not commonly kept there until after the Norman invasion.  The earliest known examples of dove-keeping occur in Norman castles of the 12th century (for example, at Rochester Castle, Kent, where nest-holes can be seen in the keep), and documentary references also begin in the 12th century. The earliest surviving, definitely dated free-standing dovecote in England was built in 1326 at Garway in Herefordshire. The Welsh name colomendy has itself become a place name (similarly in Cornwall:colomen & ty = dove house). One medieval dovecote still remains standing on the site of a hall at Potters Marston in Leicestershire, a hamlet near to the village of Stoney Stanton.

Scotland
Early purpose-built doocots in Scotland are often of a "beehive" shape, circular in plan and tapering up to a domed roof with a circular opening at the top.  These are also found in the North of England and are sometimes referred to as "tun-bellied". In the late 16th century, they were superseded by the "lectern" type, rectangular with a mono-pitched roof sloping fairly steeply in a suitable direction. Phantassie Doocot is an unusual example of the beehive type topped with a mono-pitched roof, and Finavon Doocot of the lectern type is the largest doocot in Scotland, with 2,400 nesting boxes. Doocots were built well into the 18th century in increasingly decorative forms, then the need for them died out though some continued to be incorporated into farm buildings as ornamental features. However, the 20th century saw a revival of doocot construction by pigeon fanciers, and dramatic towers clad in black or green painted corrugated iron can still be found on wasteland near housing estates in Glasgow and Edinburgh.

North America

In the U.S., an alternative English name for dovecotes is pigeonaire (from French). This word is more common than "dovecote" in Louisiana and other areas with a heavy Francophonic heritage.

Québec City, Canada, has a pigeonnier that stands in a square in Old Québec; the Pigeonnier is also the name of the square itself and is where street artists present their shows.

A notable frame dovecote is located at Bowman's Folly, added to the National Register of Historic Places in 1974.

Architecture

Functional

Their location is chosen away from large trees that can house raptors and shielded from prevailing winds and their construction obeys a few safety rules: tight access doors and smooth walls with a protruding band of stones (or other smooth surface) to prohibit the entry of climbing predators (martens, weasels...). The exterior façade was, if necessary, only evenly coated by a horizontal band, in order to prevent their ascent.

The dovecote materials can be very varied and shape and dimension extremely diverse:

square dovecote with quadruple vaulting built before the fifteenth-century (Roquetaillade Castle, Bordeaux) or Saint-Trojan near Cognac
cylindrical tower fourteenth century to the sixteenth century, and common until the present in parts of Spain, it is covered with curved tiles, flat tiles, stone lauzes roofing and occasionally with a dome of bricks. A window or skylight is the only opening.
dovecote on stone or wooden pillars cylindrical, hexagonal or square;
hexagonal dovecote like the dovecotes of the Royal Mail at Sauzé-Vaussais;
square dovecote with flat roof tiles seventeenth century and a slate roof in the eighteenth century;
lean-to structure propped against the sides of buildings.

Inside, a dovecote could be virtually empty (boulins being located in the walls from bottom to top), the interior reduced to only housing a rotating ladder, or "potence", that facilitated maintenance and the collection of eggs and squabs.

Decorative

Gable and rooftop dovecotes are associated with storybook houses with whimsical design elements.

Gallery

See also 
 Chabutro
 Columbarium – repository of cinerary urns, the word originally denoted a dovecote
 Culverhouse – old English for dovecote
 Cunninghamhead – An example of a small doocot
 Museum of Scottish Country Life – An example of a doocot on a cart shed
 Pigeonhole principle
 Pigeon keeping
 Pigeon racing – More on the sport
 Squab (food) – The meat from birds kept in a dovecote

References

Further reading

Cooke, Arthur (1920) A Book of Dovecotes London: T. N. Foulis
Emery, Gordon Curious Clwyd  (includes a list of dovecotes in Flintshire, Denbighshire and Wrexham with many photo examples)
Emery, Gordon (1996) Curious Clwyd; 2

External links

The Pigeon Cote; compiled by John Verburg / Includes an annotated edition of A Book of Dovecotes and much more information on British dovecotes
Castels of the Fields pigeon towers near Isfahan
Commentary and video on the Eglinton Dovecote
Commentary and examples of Scottish Doocots

 
Domestic pigeons
Buildings and structures used to confine animals